Beru is an atoll in the Southern Gilbert Islands in the Pacific Ocean, part of the Republic of Kiribati. Beru was previously known as Eliza, Francis Island, Maria, Peroat, Peru Island or Sunday. It's part of a larger reef with the Nuka Lagoon at its center, and the nearest island is Nikunau. The Tabiang Lagoon is present in the north. Beru is home to 2,051 inhabitants (2015 census). Due to sea surges, the atoll is experiencing coastal erosion along with damages to seawalls.

Etymology 
Beru means gecko in Gilbertese and its pronunciation is similar to Peru, with a P (there is no P sound in Gilbertese).

Geography 

The center of the reef is a shallow depression called Nuka Lagoon. The land mass occupies fully a third or more of the shallow reef structure and is positioned mostly towards the northeast edge of the reef.

Extensive spit development has created the nearly enclosed Tabiang Lagoon at the north end where mangroves are present. A small lagoon or barachois at the northern tip is surrounded by man-made fishponds to hold Milkfish, as is a similar feature at the south end of the islet. A causeway is present across the inlet mouth and a landing strip is present on the interior flats. The Nuka Lagoon, has a broad passage entering it.

The closest island to Beru is the island of Nikunau. The island is served by Beru Island Airport.

Settlements
Nuka
Rongorongo
Tabukiniberu
Teteirio

Environmental issues
The windward side of the atoll is experiencing coastal erosion due to wave action. The Leeward side of the atoll has the shallow lagoon, which the islanders have experienced becoming shallower that is linked to mud-sand accretion that is thought to be the result of the causeways. The construction of causeways has been thought to change the currents in the lagoon and along the shoreline. Frequent and stronger sea surges are damaging the seawalls that have been constructed by the islanders. Aggregate mining and the removal of coral boulders is exacerbating erosion.

Myths and legends
There are different stories told as to the creation of Beru and the other islands in the Southern Gilberts. An important legend in the culture of Beru is that spirits who lived in a tree in Samoa migrated northward carrying branches from the tree Te Kaintikuaba (the tree of life). It was these spirits, together with Nareau the Wise, who created the islands of Tungaru (the Gilbert Islands).

History
Beru Post Office opened around 1911.

Education
The island has the one Christian senior high school, Hiram Bingham High School.

Notes

References

Exhibit: The Alfred Agate Collection: The United States Exploring Expedition, 1838-1842 from the Navy Art Gallery

Gilbert Islands
Islands of Kiribati